Giovanna Galletti (27 June 1916 - 21 April 1992) was an Italian actress. She appeared in more than forty films from 1938 to 1986.

Life and career
Galletti began her career on stage at a young age, in the early 1930s, and later attended the Centro Sperimentale di Cinematografia in Rome. In the late 1930s, she started appearing in films, mostly in supporting roles, and in 1945, she appeared in Roberto Rossellini's Rome, Open City portraying the treacherous Ingrid, which is her best known role.

After the war, she focused her activities on theatre, notably working intensively at the Piccolo Teatro of Milan under the direction of Giorgio Strehler and in the stage companies led by Luigi Cimara, Annibale Ninchi, Laura Adani, and Renzo Ricci. Her later film roles mainly consisted of villains and wicked women. She was also active on radio and television.

Filmography

References

English translation of references
1. Giovanna Galletti at csfd.cz (Google translation)

External links 

1916 births
1992 deaths
Italian film actresses
Italian expatriates in Thailand